Kusal Goonewardena is an Australian physical therapist and health lecturer known for being founder and Head of Sports Medicine at Elite Akademy, University of Melbourne. He has authored several books and is a fitness expert on ABC Radio National's Life Matters program.

Early life and education 
Kusal Goonewardena was born in Sri Lanka. He had his primary education at Nalanda College, Colombo. His family travelled often during his childhood, as his father was an engineer who worked for the United Nations. They lived in Zambia, England, Oman and Bangladesh before settling down in Australia when Kusal was nine.

Kusal Goonewardena earned a bachelor's degree in physiotherapy from the University of Melbourne in 1999. He earned his Master of Physiotherapy from La Trobe University in 2007. He specializes in sports physiotherapy and high-intensity interval training (HIIT).

Career

Physical therapy 
In 1999, Goonewardena founded Vigor Sport Medicine, a chain of fitness clinics in Melbourne which double as teaching clinics for La Trobe University and Melbourne University. He also runs clinics in Bacchus Marsh and Melton, Victoria.

He became a team physiotherapist for University of Melbourne in 2002, and has been Head of Sports Medicine for the UniSport Nationals' University of Melbourne team since 2008. In an interview with The Age, Goonewardena stated that he wanted "to give something back to the University that gave me a great grounding in my career".

He was the head of the medical team for University of Melbourne during the 2009 Australian University Games, and is the official provider for the university's Elite Athlete Program. In this capacity he is known for working with Australian athletes such as Katya Crema, Lachlan Norris, Phoebe Stanley, Jeff Tho and Freddy Ovett. He is also the physical therapist of German tennis player Laura Siegemund.

Goonewardena is the head physiotherapist of Elite Akademy, a training clinic based at University of Melbourne, which he founded in May 2012. The training clinic is part of the Nona Lee Sports Centre and works with Olympic, Winter Olympic and national athletes from Melbourne University Sport. He led the medical team for German tennis player Laura Siegemund at the 2020 Australian Open. He then worked with Russian player Vera Zvonareva at the 2022 Australian Open. Svonareva had been Siegemund's tennis doubles partner at the 2020 Australian Open.

He has authored several books including 3 Minute Workouts (2015), Natural Healing: Quiet & Calm (2016) and Back Pain – 30 Days to Pain Free (2014). Goonewardena created the Kinrgize app with Elite Akademy in 2018, which allows users to track their fitness levels, workout regimens and sleeping habits.

Health expert and lecturer 
Kusal Goonewardena has been the fitness expert on ABC Radio National's Life Matters radio program since 2017. He has been featured as a health expert on The Informer with George Donikian.

Goonewardena has also been a guest expert in publications such as Body+Soul and The Sydney Morning Herald.

Goonewardena was a board member of the Entrepreneurs' Organization, an international nonprofit. In 2014, Goonewardena became a mentor at The Founder Institute in Melbourne. That same year he co-presented "The Three Entrepreneurs", part of Swinburne University of Technology's Learning from Entrepreneurs series.

In 2015, Goonewardena was a plenary speaker at the 8th International Research Conference at KDU College in Malaysia.

Publications

Books 
 Back Pain – 30 Days to Pain Free. Wilkinson Publishing. 2014. 
 3 Minute Workouts. Wilkinson Publishing. 2015. 
 Natural Healing: Quiet & Calm. co-authored by Helene Finizio. Wilkinson Publishing. 2016.

Articles 
  with Robinson, Mark; Tan, Ying; Oetomo, Denny; and Manzie, Chris.
  with Guo, Xinliang; Lu, Lei; Robinson, Mark; Tan, Ying; and Oetomo, Denny.
  with Robinson, Mark; Lu, Lei; Tan, Ying; Guo, Xinliang; Mareels, Iven; and Oetomo, Denny.
 with Robinson, Mark; Lu, Lei; Tan, Ying; Oetomo, Denny; and Manzie, Chris.
  with Jian Chin, Tze; Szoeke, Cassandra; and Gorelik, Alexandra.

References 

Living people
Year of birth missing (living people)
Australian physiotherapists
Sri Lankan emigrants to Australia
Australian exercise and fitness writers
La Trobe University alumni
Academic staff of the University of Melbourne
Alumni of Nalanda College, Colombo